Sir Malcolm Martin Macnaghten KBE, QC (12 January 1869 – 24 January 1955), was a Northern Ireland Unionist politician and judge, the fourth son of Lord Macnaghten, Bt.

Sir Malcolm was educated at Eton and Trinity College, Cambridge, where he was President of the Cambridge Union in 1890, he graduated with 1st class honours in history. He was a Cambridge Apostle; he became a Barrister at Lincoln's Inn in 1894, a Bencher in 1915 and King's Counsel (KC) in 1919.

Macnaghten sat as Member of Parliament for North Londonderry in 1922 and then for Londonderry from 1922 to 1929.  He was Recorder of Colchester from 1924 to 1928, and a Judge of the High Court of Justice, King Bench Division from 1928 to 1947.

He was knighted (KBE) in 1920 and appointed a Privy Counsellor in the 1948 New Year Honours. He was Commissary of the University of Cambridge from 1926. He married the daughter of social reformer Charles Booth and had three daughters, all of whom became socialists and married Communists including the artist Peter Laszlo Peri, and one son.

He kept a house at Campden Hill Court, London W8 and an Irish home - The End House, Portballintrae, Co. Antrim.  Sir Malcolm died in January 1955, aged 86.

Arms

References

Who Was Who

External links 
 
 

1869 births
1955 deaths
UK MPs 1922–1923
UK MPs 1923–1924
UK MPs 1924–1929
Members of the Privy Council of the United Kingdom
Knights Commander of the Order of the British Empire
People educated at Eton College
Alumni of Trinity College, Cambridge
Presidents of the Cambridge Union
Members of the Parliament of the United Kingdom for County Londonderry constituencies (1801–1922)
Members of the Parliament of the United Kingdom for County Londonderry constituencies (since 1922)
Ulster Unionist Party members of the House of Commons of the United Kingdom
British King's Counsel
Sons of life peers
Younger sons of baronets